Judit Földing-Nagy (in Hungary: Földingné Nagy Judit, born 9 December 1965) is a Hungarian runner who specializes in the marathon.  She was born in Győr, Győr-Moson-Sopron. She is the current Hungarian record-holder in marathon. She was a bronze medallist at the IAU 100 km European Championships in 2012.

Achievements

2012 – 100 km World Championship in         Seregno, Italy      -            6th

2012 – 100 km European Championship in    Seregno, Italy      -            3rd

Personal bests
 Half marathon - 1:12:05 hrs (1998)
 Marathon - 2:28:50 hrs (1996)

References

 
 

1965 births
Living people
Sportspeople from Győr
Hungarian female long-distance runners
Hungarian female marathon runners
Female ultramarathon runners
Olympic athletes of Hungary
Athletes (track and field) at the 1996 Summer Olympics
Athletes (track and field) at the 2000 Summer Olympics
World Athletics Championships athletes for Hungary
Paris Marathon female winners
Hungarian ultramarathon runners